Simon Robert Shaw (born 21 September 1973) is an English former footballer who made 176 appearances in the Football League playing as a right back for Darlington in the 1990s. He went on to play 72 times in the Conference Premier for Doncaster Rovers, and was capped for England semi-professional XI while with the club. He went on to play for Northern Premier League club Barrow, and for other non-league teams including Thornaby, Bishop Auckland, and Billingham Synthonia, where he spent four seasons, scoring 24 goals from 104 appearances, and took the free kick from which James Magowan scored the only goal of the 2009 Durham Challenge Cup final.

References

External links
 

1973 births
Living people
Footballers from Middlesbrough
English footballers
England semi-pro international footballers
Association football defenders
Darlington F.C. players
Doncaster Rovers F.C. players
Barrow A.F.C. players
Bishop Auckland F.C. players
Billingham Synthonia F.C. players
English Football League players
National League (English football) players
Northern Premier League players
Thornaby F.C. players